Zhou Yilin (born 18 September 1992) is a Chinese competitive swimmer who specializes in sprint freestyle and butterfly events.

Career
At the 2014 Asian Games in Incheon, South Korea, Zhou was part of the Chinese team which won gold in the women's 4 × 100 m freestyle relay. Zhou competed in the heats, where she swam her leg in 56.29 seconds.

At the 2016 Summer Olympics in Rio de Janeiro, Brazil, Zhou is competing in the women's 200 metre butterfly. She won the first semifinal with a time of 2:06.52 to qualify for Wednesday's final.

References

1992 births
Living people
Chinese female freestyle swimmers
Chinese female butterfly swimmers
Swimmers at the 2016 Summer Olympics
Olympic swimmers of China
Swimmers at the 2014 Asian Games
Asian Games medalists in swimming
Asian Games gold medalists for China
Medalists at the 2014 Asian Games
Universiade medalists in swimming
Universiade gold medalists for China
Medalists at the 2015 Summer Universiade
21st-century Chinese women